The Somers Affair was incident on board the American brig  while on a training mission in 1842 under Captain Alexander Slidell Mackenzie (1803-1848). Midshipman Philip Spencer (1823-1842) was accused of plotting a mutiny that would kill those who opposed him and then use the Somers as a very fast, well-armed pirate ship. Spencer was arrested and executed when the Somers was thirteen days away from shore along with two other alleged co-conspirators via hastily assembled shipboard court-martial. The ship then returned to New York.  An inquiry and a court martial both cleared Mackenzie. There was enormous public attention, most of it unfavourable to Mackenzie.

Background
Newly constructed to take children considered “the sweepings of the street,” including orphans and the poor of a nation ravaged by a long economic depression and train them into personnel of the US Navy, the brig USS Somers was placed under Captain Mackenzie in which they were beaten for "infractions" such as not being fast enough, being "disorderly", not being clean or neat enough, for rebellious adolescent behavior, and for masturbation.

Philip Spencer, who was son of Secretary of War John C. Spencer, was given a commission of Midshipman after he ran away to work on a whaler at Nantucket after an abortive stay at Union College. His father located him and convinced him that if a life on the sea was what he wanted, to live it as "a gentleman"; i.e., as a commissioned officer. Considered "wild and uncontrollable despite displaying signs of high intelligence" at his attendance of Geneva College (now Hobart College), he would assault a superior officer twice assigned to the USS North Carolina, having punishment of a court-martial averted to forced resigning due to the prominence of his father, and then re-assignment to the USS Somers.

He was popular with a large amount of the "sweeping of the streets" enlisted personnel onboard of the USS Somers and provided them gifts of money, tobacco, alcohol, and probably at least had sex with one of them, probably more. He was mainly disliked by his fellow officers though.

Philip Spencer was a founding member of the Chi Psi fraternity at Union College, Schenectady, New York, in May, 1841. H

Incident
On 26 November, Captain Mackenzie through his chain of command via purser H.M. Heiskill and first lieutenant Guert Gansevoort was informed that Wales claimed to have been offered to join a mutiny by Spencer the day prior. Captain Mackenzie was not inclined to take the matter seriously, but instructed Lt. Gansevoort to watch Spencer and the crew for evidence of confirmation.  Lt. Gansevoort stated that he learned from other members of the crew that Spencer had been observed in secret nightly conferences with seaman Small and Boatswain's Mate Samuel Cromwell.  Captain Mackenzie confronted Spencer with the mutiny allegation that evening.  Spencer replied that he told Wales the story as a joke.  Spencer was arrested and put in irons on the quarterdeck.  Papers written in English using Greek letters were discovered in a search of Spencer's locker and translated by Midshipman Henry Rodgers.

Spencer's secret note
"CERTAIN: P. Spencer, E. Andrews, D. McKinley, Wales
"DOUBTFUL: Wilson (X), McKee (X), Warner, Green, Gedney, Van Veltzor, Sullivan, Godfrey, Gallia (X), Howard (X)
"Those doubtful marked (X) will probably be induced to join before the project is carried into execution.  The remainder of the doubtful will probably join when the thing is done, if not, they must be forced.  If any not marked down wish to join after the thing is done we will pick out the best and dispose of the rest.
"NOLENS VOLENS: Sibley, Van Brunt, Blackwell, Clarke, Corney, Garratrantz, Strummond, Witmore, Waltham, Nevilles, Dickinson, Riley, Scott, Crawley, Rodman, Selsor, The Doctor
"Wheel: McKee
"Cabin: Spencer, Small, Wilson
"Wardroom: Spencer
"Steerage: Spencer, Small, Wilson
"Arm Chest: McKinley"

As evidence of a conspiracy, however, the document had several problems. For starters, nobody named “E. Andrews” was aboard Somers. Cromwell, a leading suspect, was not listed, while Wales—the man who had brought the story to his superiors’ attention—was listed as a “certain” conspirator. 

A mast failed and damaged some sail rigging on 27 November.  The timing and circumstances were regarded as suspicious by Captain Mackenzie; and Cromwell, the largest man on the crew, was questioned about his alleged meetings with Spencer. Cromwell said: "It was not me, sir – it was Small."  Small was questioned and admitted meeting with Spencer.  Both Cromwell and Small joined Spencer in being restrained on the quarterdeck.  On 28 November wardroom steward Henry Waltham was flogged for having stolen brandy for Spencer; and, after the flogging, Captain Mackenzie announced to the crew of a alleged plot by Spencer to have them murdered.  Waltham was flogged again on 29 November for suggesting theft of three bottles of wine to one of the apprentices.  Sailmaker's mate Charles A. Wilson was detected attempting to obtain a weapon on that afternoon, and Landsman McKinley and Apprentice Green missed muster when their watch was called at midnight.

Execution
Four more men were restrained on the morning of 30 November: Wilson, McKinley, Green, and Cromwell's friend, Alexander McKie.  Captain Mackenzie then addressed a letter to his four wardroom officers (First Lieutenant Gansevoort, Passed Assistant Surgeon L.W. Leecock, Purser Heiskill, and Acting Master M.C. Perry) and three oldest midshipmen (Henry Rodgers, Egbert Thompson, and Charles W. Hayes), asking their opinion as to the best course of action.  The seven convened in the wardroom to interview members of the crew.

On 1 December, the officers reported that they had "come to a cool, decided, and unanimous opinion" that Spencer, Cromwell, and Small were "guilty of a full and determined intention to commit a mutiny;" and they recommended that the three be put to death, despite Spencer's claim that the accused conspirators "had been pretending piracy", though different accounts state that the Captain “badgered” the officers to convict the accused.  They were hanged that day and buried at sea. In response to others stating that they were only thirteen days to home port, and could have just waited to try them at shore the captain noted the fatigue of his officers, the smallness of the vessel and the inadequacies of the confinement to justify the executions.

Aftermath
Somers reached St. Thomas on 5 December and returned to New York on 14 December. She remained there during a naval court of inquiry which investigated the alleged mutiny and subsequent executions. The court exonerated Mackenzie, as did a subsequent court-martial, held at his request to avoid a trial in civil court.  Nevertheless, the general populace remained skeptical.

Notes

Further reading
  Baldwin, Hanson. Sea fights and shipwrecks; true tales of the seven seas (1955) pp 183–206. online free to borrow, popular
 Cooper, James Fenimore. The Cruise of the "Somers" Illustrative of the Despotism of the Quarter Deck; and of the Unmanly Conduct of Commander MacKenzie; To which is Attached Three Letters on the Subject by the Hon. William Sturgis (1843). A famous novelist and naval historian argues the executed men were innocent.
 Feuer, A. B. "A question of mutiny." Naval History 8.2 (1994): 22+.
 Goldberg, Angus Ephraim. "The Somers mutiny of 1842" (PhD. Diss. University of St Andrews, 2000), scholarly;  online bibliography on pp. 349–366. Argues there was insubordination but no mutiny.
 McFarland, Philip James. Sea dangers: the affair of the Somers (1985) popular.
 Melton, Buckner. A Hanging Offense: The Strange Affair of the Warship Somers (Simon and Schuster, 2007), scholarly; compares the conspiracy to modern school shootings om p. 261 excerpt
 Morison, Samuel Eliot. "Old Bruin": Commodore Matthew C. Perry, 1794-1858 (1967) pp 144–62, 457–458. online free to borrow, scholarly; argues that immediate execution was necessary.  online 
 Van de Water, Frederic Franklyn. The captain called it mutiny (1954), popular.

Primary sources
 Hayford, Harrison, ed. The Somers Mutiny Affair (1959, primary sources..
 Proceedings of the court of inquiry appointed to inquire into the intended mutiny on board the United States brig of war Somers, on the high seas : held on board the United States ship North Carolina lying at the Navy Yard, New-York : with a full account of the execution of Spencer, Cromwell and Small, on board said vessel 1842 (1843)  online free to download in pdf

External links

  1995 documentary "The Curse of the Somers" by The Somers Documentary Film Project
  "Mutiny Of 1842 (USS Somers)" Documentary by George Belcher
 history.navy.mil: USS Somers
 CASE of the Somers' MUTINY.  DEFENCE of ALEXANDER SLIDELL MACKENZIE, COMMANDER OF THE U.S. RIG Somers, BEFORE THE COURT MARTIAL HELD AT THE NAVY YARD, BROOKLYN, NEW YORK: TRIBUNE OFFICE, 160 NASSAU STREET, 1843.

1842 ships
Mutinies in the United States Navy